Sutton London Borough Council is the local authority for the London Borough of Sutton in Greater London, England. It is a London borough council, one of 32 in the United Kingdom capital of London. Sutton is divided into 18 wards, each electing three councillors. Following the May 2018 council election, Sutton London Borough Council comprises 33 Liberal Democrat councillors, 18 Conservative Party councillors, and 3 Independent councillors, a decrease of the Liberal Democrat majority. The council was created by the London Government Act 1963 and replaced three local authorities: Beddington and Wallington Borough Council, Sutton and Cheam Borough Council and Carshalton Urban District Council.

History

There have previously been a number of local authorities responsible for the Sutton area. The current local authority was first elected in 1964, a year before formally coming into its powers and prior to the creation of the London Borough of Sutton on 1 April 1965. Sutton replaced Beddington and Wallington Borough Council, Sutton and Cheam Borough Council and Carshalton Urban District Council.

It was envisaged that through the London Government Act 1963 Sutton as a London local authority would share power with the Greater London Council. The split of powers and functions meant that the Greater London Council was responsible for "wide area" services such as fire, ambulance, flood prevention, and refuse disposal; with the local authorities responsible for "personal" services such as social care, libraries, cemeteries and refuse collection. As an outer London borough council it has been an education authority since 1965. This arrangement lasted until 1986 when Sutton London Borough Council gained responsibility for some services that had been provided by the Greater London Council, such as waste disposal. Since 2000 the Greater London Authority has taken some responsibility for highways and planning control from the council, but within the English local government system the council remains a "most purpose" authority in terms of the available range of powers and functions.

Powers and functions
The local authority derives its powers and functions from the London Government Act 1963 and subsequent legislation, and has the powers and functions of a London borough council. It sets council tax and as a billing authority also collects precepts for Greater London Authority functions and business rates. It sets planning policies which complement Greater London Authority and national policies, and decides on almost all planning applications accordingly.  It is a local education authority  and is also responsible for council housing, social services, libraries, waste collection and disposal, traffic, and most roads and environmental health.

Policies
The council was a pilot authority for the Big Society programme.

Summary results of elections

Since 1964 political control of the council has been held by the following parties:

References

Local authorities in London
London borough councils
Politics of the London Borough of Sutton
Leader and cabinet executives
Local education authorities in England
Billing authorities in England